Juri Fyodorovich Kashkarov (born 4 December 1963) is a former Soviet biathlete.

Life and career
Kashkarov was arguably the best Soviet biathlete of the mid-1980s. Kashkarov won his first international medals at the 1982 World Junior Championships, where he won a full set of medals, gold in the 15 km individual, silver in the relay and bronze in 10 km sprint. From 1983–91, Kashkarov competed at every Biathlon World Championships that were open to men, and won medals at every one of them, except in 1990. He won relay golds at the 1983, 1985 and 1986 World Championships and golds in the 20 km individual in 1985 and the team event in 1989.
 
In addition to his five World Championships titles, Kashkarov won silvers at the World Championship in the 1987, 1989 and 1991 relays, and a bronze in the 10 km sprint event in 1989. Kashkarov also competed at two Olympics, winning a relay gold in 1984. His best individual result at the Olympic Games was fifth in the 20 km individual in 1988. In the World Cup, Kashkarov won six individual victories and finished a total of nine times on the podium individually. His best finish in the overall World Cup was second in the 1984–85 World Cup season. Domestically, Kashkarov won three Soviet titles – in 1986 in the 20 km and in 1987 in the 10 km and 25 km military patrol.

After his sporting career, Kashkarov worked as a biathlon coach with Dynamo Moskva.

Biathlon results
All results are sourced from the International Biathlon Union.

Olympic Games
1 medal (1 gold)

World Championships
9 medals (5 gold, 3 silver, 1 bronze)

*During Olympic seasons competitions are only held for those events not included in the Olympic program.
**Team was added as an event in 1989.

Individual victories
7 victories (2 In, 5 Sp)

*Results are from UIPMB and IBU races which include the Biathlon World Cup, Biathlon World Championships and the Winter Olympic Games.

References

External links
 
 

1963 births
Living people
Soviet male biathletes
Biathletes at the 1984 Winter Olympics
Biathletes at the 1988 Winter Olympics
Olympic biathletes of the Soviet Union
Medalists at the 1984 Winter Olympics
Olympic medalists in biathlon
Olympic gold medalists for the Soviet Union
Biathlon World Championships medalists
Sportspeople from Yekaterinburg